Angelines Rodríguez Alcalde (born 24 September 1969) is a Spanish long-distance runner. She competed in the women's 3000 metres at the 1988 Summer Olympics held in Seoul, South Korea.

References

1969 births
Living people
Athletes (track and field) at the 1988 Summer Olympics
Spanish female long-distance runners
Olympic athletes of Spain
Place of birth missing (living people)